The West Gate Bridge is a steel, box girder, cable-stayed bridge in Melbourne, Victoria, Australia, spanning the Yarra River just north of its mouth into Port Phillip. It carries the West Gate Freeway and is a vital link between the inner city (CBD) and Melbourne's western suburbs, with the industrial suburbs in the west, and with the city of Geelong  to the south-west. It is part of one of the busiest road corridors in Australia. The high span bridge was built to allow large cargo ships to access the docks in the Yarra River.

The bridge passes over Westgate Park, a large environmental and recreational reserve created during the bridge's construction, and carries up to 200,000 vehicles per day.

Transportation

Motor vehicles
The West Gate Bridge is a 10-lane dual-carriageway freeway bridge, carrying five lanes of motor vehicle traffic in each direction. The freeway corridor (including the bridge itself) carries a very high volume and occupancy of traffic: a total of between 180,000 and 200,000 cars, trucks, and motorcycles use it per day, according to VicRoads. This makes the West Gate Bridge and West Gate Freeway one of the busiest road corridors in Australia.

As it is the only main direct link between Melbourne's CBD and the West, it is frequently congested during the morning and afternoon peaks and is constantly busy due to the number and type of vehicles coming in and out of the Port of Melbourne. The bridge was originally tolled but tolls were abolished in 1985 because drivers were using other routes to avoid the toll.

The bridge is windswept as there are no significant obstructing terrain features for some distance, particularly in the quadrant from south to west, a common wind direction. This can lead to issues for motorbikes, trucks and other high-sided vehicles in higher wind speeds.

Cycling
Cyclists are prohibited from using the bridge except for special bicycle events, notably the MS Summer cycle, which is a fundraising event for multiple sclerosis, and the Around the Bay in a Day Bicycle Network event that raises money for The Smith Family charity. The Westgate Punt is a foot ferry that runs directly below the bridge, taking cyclists and pedestrians across the Yarra between a jetty at Fishermans Bend near Westgate Park – Bay Trail and a jetty adjacent to Scienceworks Museum – Hobsons Bay Coastal Trail. It operates on demand, from Monday to Friday in morning and evening peaks, and on weekends and public holidays from 10:00 am to 5:00 pm.

History

Collapse 

Two years into construction of the bridge, at 11:50 am on 15 October 1970, the 112-metre (367-foot) span between piers 10 and 11 collapsed and fell 50 metres (164 feet) to the ground and water below. Thirty-five construction workers died and 18 were injured, and it remains Australia's worst industrial accident. Many of those who died were on lunch break beneath the structure in workers' huts, which were crushed by the falling span. Others were working on and inside the span when it fell. The whole  mass plummeted into the Yarra River mud with an explosion of gas, dust and mangled metal that shook buildings hundreds of metres away. Nearby houses were spattered with flying mud. On the following morning, 16 October, Sir Henry Bolte (Premier of Victoria) announced that a Royal Commission would be set up immediately to look into the cause of the disaster. The Prime Minister, John Gorton, said: "I am sure the whole of Australia is shocked and saddened by the serious accident at West Gate Bridge. Please extend my deepest sympathy to all those families to whom this tragic event has brought such grief."

Cause 

A Royal Commission into the collapse was established, which concluded on 14 July 1971. It attributed the failure of the bridge to two causes: the structural design by designers Freeman Fox & Partners, and an unusual method of construction by World Services and Construction, the original contractors for the project.

It was proposed that the higher one be weighted down with 10 concrete blocks, each weighing , which were located on-site. The weight of those blocks caused the span to buckle, which was a sign of structural failure. The longitudinal joining of the half-girders was partially complete when orders came through to remove the buckle. As the bolts were removed, the bridge snapped back and the span collapsed.

Collapse memorials 
Six twisted fragments of the collapsed bridge can be found in the West Gate garden at the engineering faculty of Monash University, Clayton campus. The university acquired them after being asked to participate in the investigation of the collapse. It is said that they are to remind engineers of the consequences of their errors.

Commemorations have been held on 15 October every year since the collapse. A West Gate Bridge Memorial Park to workers who died is located near the bridge. It opened on 15 October 2004, the 34th anniversary of the collapse. It includes the existing West Gate Bridge Memorial and Sculpture, and the memorial for six who died in the Spotswood Yarra Sewer Tunnel collapse of 12 April 1895 (Good Friday).

Completion
There was a series of three collapses of other steel box girder bridges during their construction between 1969 and 1971: the Fourth Danube Bridge in Vienna on 6 November 1969; Cleddau Bridge (Milford Haven), Wales on 2 June 1970; and the South Bridge over the Rhine River in Koblenz on 10 November 1971. The UK government responded by setting up the Merrison Committee of Inquiry, headed by Sir Alec Merrison.The Merrison Committee provided an interim report in May 1971, and a final report in February 1973 on new design and workmanship rules for steel box-girder bridges. 

Following the publication of the Report of the Royal Commission in August 1971, the Lower Yarra Crossing Authority, a non-profit company, formed its own Directorate of Engineering. In September 1971, Hans G. Wolfram, FIEAust and a Director of Gutteridge, Haskins & Davey, was appointed the Director of Engineering. He was responsible for the re-design, supervision of construction, and contract administration of West Gate Bridge until its completion. The Chairman of the Lower Yarra Crossing Authority was Oscar G. Meyer.The Deputy Chairman was Bernard J. Callinan who was also Chairman of the Technical Committee. In 1971, the Authority was renamed as the West Gate Bridge Authority.

Intensive reviews of the structure focused attention on the inadequate strength of the original design of the bridge's deck. This consisted of a 100 mm reinforced concrete slab acting compositely with a steel deck plate stiffened by bulb flats. Numerous proposals were examined and Hans Wolfram recommended replacing the original steel and concrete deck by a lighter and stronger orthotropic steel deck as technically and economically the most appropriate solution. This orthotropic deck is a steel plate stiffened longitudinally by closely spaced cellular troughs and laterally, at intervals, by cross beams. The Proof Engineer was Professor Dr-Ing. Karlheinz Roik who was a professor of steel construction at TU Berlin. He independently checked the re-design of the West Gate Bridge in accordance with the recommendations of the Royal Commission. The re-design was also checked against the German code DIN 4114 and the Appraisal Rules of the Merrison Committee's reports. The re-design was endorsed by four other university Professors of Civil Engineering: F.B. Bull (Adelaide); N.W. Murray (Monash); J.W. Roderick (Sydney) and L.K. Stevens (Melbourne).

Construction resumed in 1972 with World Services and Construction continuing to fabricate the boxes and to carry out their sub-assembly, but with a joint venture between Redpath Dorman Long and John Holland (Constructions) completing the construction of the steel portion of the bridge.  Additional strengthening of the structure had to be designed for the erection because the stresses could exceed those of the in-service condition. The joint venture contractor engaged Flint and Neill of London for this and their design was proof-checked by the Directorate of Engineering.  

King Charles III as Prince of Wales visited the West Gate Bridge project in October 1974 and met with members of the West Gate Bridge Authority and workers. 

After 10 years of construction, the bridge was completed in 1978 at a cost of $202 million. 

Speed cameras were erected on the bridge in 2004, but were not activated until September 2005, because of issues with a similar camera on the Western Ring Road. However these speed cameras were switched off in 2005, and currently remain disabled, as the sway of the bridge prevents secondary verification of the alleged speed against a fixed point. In 2006 the State Government spent $1.3 million on erecting railway style boom barriers at each entrance to the bridge to block traffic in the event of a terrorist attack. Costing $350,000 to install and $15,000 a year to maintain, the flags were unfurled on 24 September 2008.

On 5 August 2007, it was reported that the Victorian Government was planning a $240 million project to identify and eliminate structural weaknesses in the bridge, with specific concerns including crash barriers, cracking, corrosion and potential buckling. News of the work was prompted by the collapse of the I-35W Mississippi River bridge in Minneapolis. The bridge was built to carry 40,000 vehicles a day but volumes had grown to more than four times the original number, approximately 160,000 vehicles on an average day.

Expansion
On 17 May 2006, the State Government as part of its Meeting Our Transport Challenges plan announced plans to change traffic flow in peak periods on the West Gate Bridge and approaches to it, using a reversible lane to provide five traffic lanes in the peak direction, opposing traffic having three lanes. This was to be done using overhead signals and barriers; the State Government allocated funds to this project in its 2006–2007 state budget, but the works were never carried out.

In 2008 the expansion plans were revised as part of the Victorian Transport Plan, when it was announced that the bridge would be widened to five lanes in each direction, the space being gained by narrowing the existing traffic lanes and closing the emergency lanes, in a move criticised by Victorian fire, police and ambulance unions. Overhead gantries would be used to direct traffic out of lanes when breakdowns and accidents occur. Roads Minister Tim Pallas claimed that the plan would allow the bridge to carry 50 per cent more vehicles, while reducing crashes by 20 per cent. Structural analysis work on the bridge concluded in early 2009, and was completed over a 14-month period. Works to strengthen the bridge commenced in the first half of 2009, with the entire strengthening project scheduled for completion in 2011.

On 22 June 2011, all five lanes were finally opened to the public in both directions, with the completion of the required strengthening works. The full cost was $347 million, $107 million more than VicRoads had originally planned, but included considerable additional scope of works. This cost increase was after the deletion of $20 million architectural lighting originally included in the scope of the works. The engineers for the strengthening project, Flint & Neill and Sinclair Knight Merz, won the 2012 Institution of Structural Engineers Supreme Award for structural engineering for the project.

Flags
On 11 March 2014, a 10-metre (33 ft) high artist-designed flag was raised on the western side of the bridge as part of the 'Melbourne Now' exhibition, On Top of the World: Flags for Melbourne. The flag was a collaborative design between four contributing artists (Brook Andrew, Helen Johnson, Kate Daw and Jon Campbell) who shared an affinity with the bridge. The flag design is a reference to 1803 maritime communications by Rear Admiral Home Riggs Popham, the symbol on the flag meaning 'I can spare what you asked for'. The flag was flown until the end of the 'Melbourne Now' show on 25 March 2014. Since July 2022, the Aboriginal flag will formally fly over the bridge alongside the Australian flag permanently as announced. The cost was not disclosed, as with $25 million for the Sydney Harbour Bridge.

Future 

Strong growth in suburbs along the route, and increased freight through the Port of Melbourne, means that the corridor is experiencing traffic congestion during peak periods, is vulnerable to short-term interruptions, and is rapidly approaching capacity. Proposals to abate congestion by allowing more traffic have included bridge widening, a tunnel underneath the river, or adding a second deck to the bridge. Many such plans have come under fire from community groups such as the Public Transport Users Association and Environment Victoria, which advocate investment in alternative forms of transport.

A private sector report, made public in February 2006, suggested building a companion tunnel to the West Gate Bridge under the Yarra River, made up of three separate bores to carry traffic in either direction and a freight rail line. The portals would have been north of Williamstown Road in Port Melbourne, and between Blackshaws and Melbourne roads in Altona North.

In 2018 work began on the West Gate Tunnel, which was designed to provide an alternative to the West Gate Bridge. Work is expected to finish in 2024.

The State Government also assessed options for the development of another east–west link in 2008. Sir Rod Eddington, Chairman of the Victorian Major Events Company and former CEO of British Airways, was to head the assessment of the future east–west connections and recommend the best way forward for public transport, road and freight travel for the entire Monash-West Gate corridor. By December 2008 the State Government announced it was planning for such a link, anticipated to be a three-kilometre road tunnel under Footscray and the Maribyrnong River. Linking Dynon and Footscray Roads in the Port of Melbourne precinct to Geelong Road in West Footscray, now known as the East-West road connection, its cost is estimated at more than $2.5 billion.

Incidents

Suicide location
Owing to its height, the bridge became a popular location for suicides, with police data in the early 2000s showing up to one suicide occurring every three weeks at the West Gate Bridge. A 2004 coroner's report recommended anti-suicide fencing or barriers be erected on the bridge to deter people from attempting to end their lives.

Those who argued for a suicide barrier claimed that most of those who jump from the West Gate Bridge do so through impulse, and that police officers who tried to save jumpers were putting their own lives in danger. There were reported incidents of police officers dangling off the side of the bridge while holding onto would-be jumpers. A 2000 Royal Melbourne Hospital study on people who jumped from the bridge found at least 62 cases between 1991 and 1998. Seven people survived the  fall. Around 74 per cent of those who jumped from the bridge were male, with an average age of 33. More than 70 per cent were suffering from mental illness. Of those who jumped off the West Gate Bridge, 31 per cent fell onto land. Some of those who landed in water drowned afterwards.

Installation of anti-suicide fencing 
In June 2008, Gabriela Garcia jumped off the West Gate Bridge with her 22-month-old son Oliver, and their bodies were found on the river bank below.

Seven months later on 29 January 2009, a 4-year-old girl, Darcey Freeman, was thrown off the bridge by her father, Arthur Freeman.  She survived the fall but later died in hospital.  Freeman was found guilty of murder and sentenced to life in prison in April 2011; the apparent trigger for the incident was his recent separation and apparent fear of loss of access to the children (similar to the 2005 Robert Farquarson case).

A week after that incident, on 5 February 2009, 17 year old Allem Halkic jumped from the inbound lanes near the Todd Road exit on the Port Melbourne side of the bridge. On walking up the bridge he was reported to have said to the VicRoads operator via the emergency phone, "You better get someone here before I jump". Police responded within minutes of this, but were too late to save Halkic and found his body in the Westgate Park below. The case was significant as Halkic was a victim of cyberbullying in the days prior to this, and reportedly became the first death resulting from cyberbullying in Victoria. In October 2011 a coronial inquest was held into the death, again recommending (among other things) the installation of anti-suicide barriers on the bridge.

Following these incidents, a temporary suicide barrier of concrete crash barriers topped with a welded mesh fence was erected from February 2009.  A permanent metal mesh barrier was subsequently installed along the length of the bridge in 2010–11 at a cost of $20 million. The barrier is reported to have reduced suicides from the bridge by 85 per cent.

See also
 List of disasters in Australia by death toll
 List of bridge disasters
 West Gate Freeway
 Erskine Bridge
 Tasman Bridge
 Cleddau Bridge
 Suicide bridge

References

External links
West Gate Bridge Memorial
Public Record Office of Victoria's special site on the Westgate Bridge collapse
   1971 
Worksafe Victoria
 

Bridges in Melbourne
Cable-stayed bridges in Australia
Bridges completed in 1978
Bridges over the Yarra River
Former toll bridges in Australia
Road bridges in Victoria (Australia)
1978 establishments in Australia
Articles containing video clips
Landmarks in Melbourne
Transport in the City of Melbourne (LGA)
Transport in the City of Hobsons Bay
Buildings and structures in the City of Hobsons Bay
Buildings and structures in the City of Melbourne (LGA)